William Lashly (25 December 1867 – 12 June 1940) was a Royal Navy seaman who served as lead stoker on both the Discovery expedition and the Terra Nova expedition to Antarctica, for which he was awarded the Polar Medal. Lashly was also recognised with the Albert Medal for playing a key role in saving the life of a comrade on the second of the two expeditions.

Career

Discovery expedition 
The son of a farm worker, Lashly was born in Hambledon, Hampshire, a village near Portsmouth, England. On this expedition, Lashly proved a success and was a member of Scott's "Farthest West" party exploring Victoria Land in 1903.

A teetotaller and non-smoker, he was quiet and strong, good-natured, dependable and acknowledged by Reginald Skelton as 'the best man far and away in the ship'. Before joining Scott's next Antarctic expedition in 1910, he served as an instructor at the Royal Naval College, Osborne, on the Isle of Wight.

Terra Nova expedition 

On Scott's second expedition in 1911–1913, Lashly was initially in charge of one of the expedition's two motor sledges which were to haul supplies southward in support of the polar party.  However, the sledges quickly broke down, and the motor party had to switch to man-hauling the supplies.

On 4 January 1912, along with Lieutenant Edward Evans and Tom Crean, he was a member of the last support party to be sent back by Scott on his way to the pole. During the  return journey, Evans became seriously ill with scurvy, and on 11 February, collapsed, unable to walk any further. Still  from Hut Point camp and safety, he tried to persuade Lashly and Crean to leave him to save themselves, but they refused.

Strapping him onto the sledge, they pulled him for days until with only one to two days' food rations left, but still four or five days' sledge pulling to do, they had to stop. Lashly then stayed with Evans in the tent to nurse him while Crean walked the remaining  alone in 18 hours to reach Hut Point camp, where he was able to fetch help. Extracts from Lashly's polar journals, chronicling his tribulations with the motor sledges and the return journey with Evans, were included in Apsley Cherry-Garrard's book, The Worst Journey in the World. Both Lashly and Crean received the Albert Medal for saving Evans' life.

Royal Navy 
Later he served as a customs officer in Cardiff. Upon his retirement in 1932, he returned to Hambledon where he lived in a house he called "Minna Bluff", after one of the landmarks on the road to the South Pole. Lashly died on 12 June 1940.

Antarctic diaries 
In 1969, Lashly's diaries were edited and published by A. R. Ellis as Under Scott's Command: Lashly's Antarctic Diaries. It provides insight into both the Discovery and Terra Nova expeditions from the perspective of one of the men rather than the more common accounts published by officers.

References

Footnotes

Bibliography

External links 
 

1867 births
1940 deaths
Explorers of Antarctica
People from Hambledon, Hampshire
Recipients of the Albert Medal (lifesaving)
Recipients of the Polar Medal
Royal Navy personnel of World War I
Royal Navy sailors
Terra Nova expedition